This is the list of awards and nominations received by the American television series Ally McBeal (1997–2002).

By Awards

American Choreography Awards
2000: Outstanding Achievement in Television – Episode (for "I Will Survive", won)

American Cinema Editors (ACE)
1999: Best Edited One-Hour Series for Television (for "Car Wash", won)

BAFTA Television Awards
1998: Best International Programme or Series (nominated)

Casting Society of America (CSA)
1999: Best Casting – Episodic Comedy (nominated)
2000: Best Casting – Episodic Comedy (won)

Cinema Audio Society (CAS)
1998: Outstanding Achievement in Sound Mixing for a Television Series (for "Making Spirits Bright", nominated)

Costume Designers Guild (CDG)
1999: Excellence in Costume Design for Television – Contemporary (nominated)
2000: Excellence in Costume Design for Television – Contemporary (nominated)

Directors Guild of America (DGA)
1997: Outstanding Directing – Drama Series, Night (James Frawley for "Pilot", nominated)
2000: Outstanding Directing – Comedy Series (Bill D'Elia for "The Last Virgin", nominated)

Emmy Awards
1998: Outstanding Writing for a Comedy Series (David E. Kelley for "Theme Of Life")
1998: Outstanding Sound Mixing For A Comedy Series Or A Special (Kurt Kassulke, Peter R. Kelsey, Paul Lewis and Nello Torri for "Boy To The World") (won)
1998: Outstanding Single-camera Picture Editing For A Series (Thomas R. Moore for "Cro-Magnon")
1998: Outstanding Lead Actress in a Comedy Series (Calista Flockhart)
1998: Outstanding Directing for a Comedy Series (James Frawley for "Pilot") 
1998: Outstanding Directing for a Comedy Series (Allan Arkush for "Cro-Magnon")
1998: Outstanding Comedy Series (David E. Kelley, Mike Listo, Jeffrey Kramer, Jonathan Pontell, Steve Robin and Pam Wisne)
1998: Outstanding Casting For A Series (Jeanie Bacharach and Sharon Jetton)
1998: Outstanding Art Direction For A Series (Diane O'Connell and Peter Politanoff for "Boy To The World")
1998: Outstanding Costumes for a Series (Loree Parral, Shelly Levine and Michelle Roth for "Cro-Magnon")
1999: Outstanding Writing for a Comedy Series (David E. Kelley for "Sideshow")
1999: Outstanding Supporting Actor in a Comedy Series (Peter MacNicol)
1999: Outstanding Supporting Actress in a Comedy
Series (Lucy Liu)
1999: Outstanding Sound Mixing For A Comedy Series Or A Special (Peter R. Kelsey, Paul Lewis and Nello Torri for "Love's Illusions") (won)
1999: Outstanding Single-camera Picture Editing For A Series (Philip Neel for "Angels & Blimps")
1999: Outstanding Lead Actress in a Comedy Series (Calista Flockhart)
1999: Outstanding Guest Actress in a Comedy Series (Tracey Ullman) (won) 
1999: Outstanding Guest Actor in a Comedy Series (John Ritter)
1999: Outstanding Directing for a Comedy Series (Arlene Sanford for "Those Lips, That Hand")
1999: Outstanding Costumes for a Series (Rachael Stanley for "Making Spirits Bright")
1999: Outstanding Comedy Series (Peter Burrell, Jeffrey Kramer, David E. Kelley, Mike Listo, Jonathan Pontell, Steve Robin and Pam Wisne) (won)
1999: Outstanding Casting For A Series (Jeanie Bacharach and Sharon Jetton)
1999: Outstanding Art Direction For A Series (Diane O'Connell and Peter Politanoff for "Making Spirits Bright")
2000: Outstanding Supporting Actor in a Comedy Series (Peter MacNicol)
2000: Outstanding Sound Mixing For A Comedy Series Or A Special (Paul M. Lewis, Peter R. Kelsey and Nello Torri for "Car Wash") (won)
2000: Outstanding Directing for a Comedy Series (Bill D'Elia for "Ally McBeal: The Musical, Almost")
2001: Outstanding Supporting Actor in a Comedy Series (Peter MacNicol) (won)
2001: Outstanding Supporting Actor in a Comedy Series (Robert Downey Jr.)
2001: Outstanding Lead Actress in a Comedy Series (Calista Flockhart)
2001: Outstanding Guest Actress in a Comedy Series(Bernadette Peters)
2001: Outstanding Guest Actress in a Comedy Series (Jami Gertz)
2001: Outstanding Cinematography For A Single-camera Series (Billy Dickson for "Cloudy Skies, Chance Of Parade")
2001: Outstanding Casting for a Comedy Series (Ken Miller and Nikki Valko) (won)
2002: Outstanding Cinematography For A Single-camera Series (Billy Dickson for "Reality Bites")

Golden Globe Awards
1997: Best Actress – Musical or Comedy Series (Calista Flockhart for playing "Ally McBeal", won)
1997: Best Series – Musical or Comedy (won)
1998: Best Actress – Musical or Comedy Series (Flockhart, nominated)
1998: Best Series – Musical or Comedy (won)
1998: Best Supporting Actress – Series, Miniseries or TV Film (Jane Krakowski for playing "Elaine Vassal", nominated)
1999: Best Actress – Musical or Comedy Series (Flockhart, nominated)
1999: Best Series – Musical or Comedy (nominated)
2000: Best Actress – Musical or Comedy Series (Flockhart, nominated)
2000: Best Series – Musical or Comedy (nominated)
2000: Best Supporting Actor – Series, Miniseries or TV Film (Robert Downey, Jr. for playing "Larry Paul", won)
2001: Best Actress – Musical or Comedy Series (Flockhart, nominated)
2001: Best Series – Musical or Comedy (nominated)

Producers Guild of America (PGA)
2000: Television Producer of the Year – Episodic Comedy (nominated)

Peabody Awards
1998: Peabody Award (won)

Satellite Awards
1998: Best Actress – Musical or Comedy Series (Calista Flockhart for playing "Ally McBeal", nominated)
1999: Best Actress – Musical or Comedy Series (Flockhart, nominated)
2000: Best Actress – Musical or Comedy Series (Jane Krakowski for playing "Elaine Vassal", nominated)
2002: Best Supporting Actor – Musical or Comedy Series (Peter MacNicol for playing "John Cage", nominated)

Screen Actors Guild (SAG)
1997: Outstanding Actress – Comedy Series (Calista Flockhart for playing "Ally McBeal", nominated)
1997: Outstanding Cast – Comedy Series (nominated)
1998: Outstanding Actor – Comedy Series (Peter MacNicol for playing "John Cage", nominated)
1998: Outstanding Actress – Comedy Series (Flockhart, nominated)
1998: Outstanding Cast – Comedy Series (won)
1999: Outstanding Actor – Comedy Series (MacNicol, nominated)
1999: Outstanding Actress – Comedy Series (Flockhart, nominated)
1999: Outstanding Actress – Comedy Series (Lucy Liu for playing "Ling Woo", nominated)
1999: Outstanding Cast – Comedy Series (nominated)
2000: Outstanding Actor – Comedy Series (Robert Downey, Jr. for playing "Larry Paul", won)
2000: Outstanding Actor – Comedy Series (MacNicol, nominated)
2000: Outstanding Actress – Comedy Series (Flockhart, nominated)
2000: Outstanding Cast – Comedy Series (nominated)

References

External links
 Awards won by Ally McBeal at IMDb

Ally McBeal
Awards